Super PickUps is a truck racing game developed by Milestone and published by XS Games. It was released on 26 September 2007 on the PlayStation 2 and Wii. It is the sequel to the million-seller Super Trucks Racing. 

This game provides the same racing thrills as Super Trucks but downsized to tricked-out pickups. Race on 20 different master challenging tracks and earn big cash to upgrade the suspension, engine, tires, and body of your trucks. There are 16 unique truck body's to choose from. Each one has unique handling. Get ready for the toughest conditions! You can choose between dry or wet weather. Wet weather makes the trucks more slick and tougher to race with.

Gameplay
There are two ways to play the game. The first is Quick Race. It's simple, choose your truck, livery, track, track condition, and lap number. The other is Career mode. Here you choose your team and truck. Each team gives different rewards. Follow the tasks the team give you and you earn lots of money. Once you earn enough money you can buy upgrades to your suspension, engine, and tires. Complete third or better to beat the championship and unlock different body types. In Career mode there is a damage meter. Don't let the bar go all the way down or your truck will be totaled and you won't be able to complete the race. You can also complete challenges in Career mode to earn rewards.

Gameplay modes

References

2007 video games
Windows games
PlayStation 2 games
PlayStation Network games
Truck racing video games
Milestone srl games
Video games developed in Italy
XS Games games